is a Japanese/Chinese anime television series animated by BLADE and produced by Emon. It is based on Gemini Xin Luo's novel Zuobi Yishu. The anime series premiered on October 5, 2016 as a short anime and ran alongside To Be Hero.

Plot 
In a world where people have been sorted since childhood by exams, only those who excel obtain happiness. L (Learning) Types, who prioritize study, and C (Cheating) Types, those who choose not to study to pass, will battle and team up in exams. C Type protagonist Muming Zhuge 诸葛睦明 and L Type heroine Qiaoyi Huang battle together to pass tests.

Characters 

His name originates from Zhuge Liang.

His  name originates from Zhou Yu.

Media

Anime 
The anime is directed by Keitaro Motonaga, with animation by Haoliners Animation League. Mai Matsuura and Norie Tanaka designed the characters. They also serve as chief animation directors, alongside Ryousuke Tanigawa. Yasunori Ebina is in charge of the sound effects and Go Sakabe is the composer of the series. Takamitsu Kouno collaborates on the writing of scenarios. Yutaka Kamogawa is credited as the main animator. Kenichi Ohnuki and Hisashi Saito are credited with design works, while Goichi Iwahata is credited with prop design. Kei Ichikura is the art director, while Hideki Imaizumi is the director of photography. Aiko Shinohara is in charge of the color designs.

The female idol group Kamen Joshi performs the opening theme "Kasoku Suru Trial," while Aina Kusuda performs the ending theme song "Welcome Future," with lyrics by Saori Kodama, composition by Takahiro Yamada, and arrangement by Shinya Saitou.

Notes

References

External links 
 
 

Tokyo MX original programming
Education in fiction
Chinese web series
Chinese animated television series
2016 Chinese television series debuts
Haoliners Animation League
2016 Chinese television series endings
2016 Japanese television series endings